Melipotis jucunda, the merry melipotis moth, is a species of moth in the family Erebidae. It is found in Mexico (Yucatán, Mérida), Colombia, most of the United States, western Canada and northeast Brazil.

The wingspan is 35–42 mm. The ground colour of the forewings is medium grey, with fine longitudinal streaks and black dashes between the veins on the distal portion. The hindwings are pure white to pale grey with dark veins, a thin discal spot and a wide marginal band. There are two or three generations in New Jersey and multiple generations in the southern part of the range.

The larvae feed on Salix bonplandia and Salix wrighti, Acacia species and Calliandra eriophylla.

Subspecies
Melipotis jucunda jucunda
Melipotis jucunda hadeniformis (Behr, 1870) (California)

References

Moths described in 1818
Melipotis